Udege (or alternatively Udihe, Udekhe, or Udeghe) may refer to:
the Udege language
the Udege people